J++ may refer to:

 Visual J++, Microsoft's discontinued implementation of the Java programming language.
 Journalism++, a European datajournalism network.